Aaron Padilla (born 1974) is an American artist and art educator.

Life
He was born in Wahiawa, Hawaii in 1974. He received a BFA in painting and printmaking from Pacific Lutheran University in 1996, and an MFA in ceramics from the University of Hawaiʻi at Mānoa in 2001.  Padilla has taught at the University of Hawaiʻi at Mānoa, the Honolulu Museum of Art and the Hawaii Potters' Guild.

He is currently the Director of Learning and Engagement at the Honolulu Museum of Art. 
He has created paintings and utilitarian ceramics, as well as abstract and semi-abstract ceramic sculptures. In his current body of work, small angled pieces of wood are assembled to give the illusion of wood being woven or tied into knots.

The Hawaii State Art Museum, the Fendi Foundation for Design, the Judiciary Building at Kapolei, and the Hawaii State Capitol are among the collections holding works by Aaron Padilla.

References
International Art Society of Hawai'i, Kuilima Kākou, Hawai’i-Japan Joint Exhibition, Honolulu, International Art Society of Hawai'i, 2004, p. 39
Morse, Marcia and Allison Wong, 10 Years: The Contemporary Museum at First Hawaiian Center, The Contemporary Museum, Honolulu, 2006, p. 91
Nelson, Shane, In Good Form, Renowned Sculptor Fred Roster and Rising Star Aaron Padilla Share a Common Thread, HiLuxury, June/July 2013, Vol 7, Issue 1, pp. 40–42
Wong, Allison, The Contemporary Museum at First Hawaiian Center, The Contemporary Museum, Honolulu HI, 2006, p. 91

Footnotes

External links
The artist's website
http://www.honolulumagazine.com/Honolulu-Magazine/May-2012/Rising-Artists-in-Hawaii/index.php?cparticle=4

1974 births
Living people
21st-century ceramists
Modern sculptors
American woodworkers
American artists of Filipino descent
People from Honolulu County, Hawaii
Pacific Lutheran University alumni
University of Hawaiʻi at Mānoa faculty
University of Hawaiʻi at Mānoa alumni
Sculptors from Hawaii
Ceramists from Hawaii
Directors of museums in the United States